Joseph Onika (born May 2, 1967, in Komunima’aga Village, Longgu District, Guadalcanal Province) is a Solomon Islands politician.

Career
He worked in catering before going into politics. His career in national politics began when he was elected to Parliament as the member for East Central Guadalcanal in the August 2010 general election, standing as an independent candidate. He was then appointed Minister for Women, Youth and Children's Affairs in Prime Minister Danny Philip's Cabinet.

In April 2011, he was reshuffled to Minister for Lands, Housing and Survey. When Gordon Darcy Lilo replaced Philip as Prime Minister in November 2011, Onika retained his position in government.

Achievements 
He was successfully competing in athletics.

References

1967 births
Living people
Members of the National Parliament of the Solomon Islands
People from Guadalcanal Province
Solomon Islands male sprinters
Solomon Islands sportsperson-politicians
Housing ministers of the Solomon Islands
Women's ministers of the Solomon Islands